The 1981 Cronulla-Sutherland Sharks season was the fifteenth in the club's history. They competed in the NSWRFL's 1981 Premiership as well as the 1981 Craven Mild Cup and 1981 Tooth Cup.

Ladder

References

Cronulla-Sutherland Sharks seasons
Cronulla-Sutherland Sharks season